Nak is a village in Tolna County, Hungary.

External links
Street map 

Populated places in Tolna County